Scaevola glabrata is a species of flowering plant in the family Goodeniaceae. It is a small, spreading shrub with fan-shaped blue flowers and elliptic to egg-shaped leaves.

Description

Taxonomy and naming
Scaevola glabrata was first formally described in 1986 by Roger Charles Carolin and the description was published in Flora of South Australia.The specific epithet (glabrata)  means glabrous.

Distribution and habitat
This scaevola grows mostly in rocky locations, sometimes in sand, extending from the Northern Territory, not including Arnhem Land, south to the northern parts of South Australia and just over the border into Queensland.

References

 

glabrata
Flora of South Australia
Flora of the Northern Territory
Flora of Queensland